is a Japanese singer-songwriter and actor from Nagasaki. He debuted in 1990 with the single "Tsuioku no Ame no Naka".

Fukuyama is represented by the agency Amuse, Inc.

Career 
While he can also be seen in Japanese television dramas, Fukuyama is best known for his singing career. His 1992 breakout single "Good night" gained a wide audience because of its tie-in with the TV drama Ai wo Douda. In 1993, he made his first appearance in Kōhaku Uta Gassen, on which only successful J-pop and enka artists are invited to perform. Propelled by the success of Hitotsu Yane no Shita, in which he played Chinichan, the second older brother in the Kashiwagi family, he had his first million-selling single, "It's Only Love/Sorry Baby", in 1994. His 1995 single "Hello" became the second highest selling single that year.

He took a hiatus in 1996, stopping all his entertainment activities except his radio shows. He returned to the entertainment scene in 1998, and his first single after two years hiatus, "Heart/You", landed at number 3 on Oricon chart and sold 569,000 copies in total. Encouraged by this success, he began his Daikanshasai (Thanksgiving) series of concerts, to show his appreciation from the support he obtained from his fans.

"Sakura Zaka" and "Niji" are among Masaharu's popular songs. His 2000 single "Sakura Zaka" sold more than 751,000 copies in its first week and remained at the top of the Japanese Oricon chart for 3 consecutive weeks; it sold about 2,299,000 copies on the Oricon charts overall. "Niji" was a theme song for the Japanese drama Water Boys. His triple A-side single "Niji/Himawari/Sore ga Subete sa", released on August 26, 2003, debuted at No. 1 on the Oricon single charts and topped them for five consecutive weeks. His has cemented his status as the best-selling male solo artist in Japan, having sold 21.27 million copies so far.

In 2007, after a four-years absence from drama, Fukuyama returned to television, starring as the brilliant but eccentric physics associate professor, Manabu Yukawa, in the television drama Galileo. He won "Best Actor" at the 55th Television Drama Academy Awards for the role. He also formed a band, KOH+, with his co-star in the drama Kou Shibasaki.

In 2008, NHK selected Fukuyama to portray Sakamoto Ryōma, the title character, in the 2010 year-long prime-time television Taiga drama Ryōmaden.

In 2009, he held his 20th anniversary national arena tour which covered 36 performances in 12 cities over four consecutive months (June to September) with a total audience count of 500,000. Two weeks before the tour started, he held four shows at the Nippon Budokan (May 28, 29 and June 4, 5) his first ever solo concerts there, as part of his almost yearly thanksgiving concert ritual. While the Tour was still ongoing, on August 29 and 30, he went back to his hometown Nagasaki and held two open-air concerts at the Mount Inasa Park outdoor stage, with simultaneous public viewing free of charge for 50,000 Nagasaki citizens at the nearby Nagasaki Baseball Stadium (commonly known as the Big N to locals). Official figures announced a final audience count of 80,000 for the Mount Inasa concerts and Big N public viewing, in just over the two days alone.

The master ringtone (Chaku Uta) download of his song "Hatsukoi" began on November 6, 2009. It sold about 150,000 downloads in five days, and, on November 13, 2009, it was announced that the song would be released as a physical CD single on December 16, 2009. The single debuted at number 1 on the Oricon weekly charts, with sales of around 151,000 copies in the first week of the release. He performed "Hatsukoi" at the 60th NHK Kōhaku Uta Gassen on New Year's Eve 2009, his first appearance at the event since 1993 and joined John Woo's upcoming film Manhut

Personal life
Fukuyama married Japanese actress Kazue Fukiishi on September 28, 2015, the same day as her birthday. Their first child was born on December 22, 2016.

Discography

1990: Dengon
1991: Lion
1991: Bros.
1992: Boots
1993: Calling
1994: On and On
1998: Sing a Song
2001: F
2006: 5 Nen Mono
2009: Zankyō
2014: Human
2015: Tama Riku

Filmography

Films

TV dramas

Television shows
Fukuyama Engineering, as the factory chief (TV Asahi, 2002)
NHK Special: Hot Spots Saigo no Rakuen, as narrator (NHK, 2011)
Doraemon 3-hour SP, as Masaaki Fukuyama (voice) (TV Asahi, 2011)

Guitar collection

Acoustic guitars

Gibson J-50 (1959) - recording, songwriting, Hatsukoi PV
Gibson J-45 (1947)
Gibson J-45 (1968)
Gibson J-200 (1959) - bought this on first trip to the US
Gibson LG-1 (1968)
Gibson B-45-12 (1962)
Gibson Hummingbird (1969) - recording, songwriting etc
Martin OOO-28 (1968) - Hotaru PV
Martin D-28 (1979)
Martin D-45 (1979)
Martin Cowboy III (2001)
Martin OO-18DBCY Signature Edition (Yoshikawa Chuei model)(2002)
Martin GPCPA-1
Martin The Backpacker Guitar
Don Musser 1994 - very limited numbers produced
George Lowden Model 038
Gretsch 6022 Rancher (1955) - Hello PV
Alhambra W-2
Larry Pogreba Resonator Guitar
Jose Ramirez (model unknown)
K.Yairi 一五一会 (2009.02.06) - (40th) birthday present from Begin, with "M.FUKUYAMA" printed

Electric bass

Fender Jazz Bass (1965)
Sugi Original Custom
Hōfner Vintage63 Violin Bass
Greco VB-90 SB
Music Man Sting Ray-4 BCR/RM (2005)

Electric guitars
Gibson Les Paul Gold Top (1956)
Gibson Les Paul (1959)
Gibson Les Paul Custom SG (1962) - KOH+ Saiai PV
Gibson Les Paul Custom (1970) - Sou ~new love new world~ PV
Gibson Custom Shop Duane Allman Signature Les Paul "Pilot Run" (2004)
Gibson Custom Shop Jimi Hendrix Psychedelic Flying V - Keshin PV
Gibson Custom Shop 50th Anniversary Korina Explorer AGED - REDxBLUE live
Gibson Les Paul Special (1989)
Gibson Les Paul Junior-TV (1960)
Gibson Eric Clapton Crossroad ES-335
Gibson Custom Shop John Lennon Les Paul Junior - ON AND ON live, Michishirube tour
Fender Stratocaster (1956)
Fender Custom Shop Stratocaster - recording and live performances
Fender Custom Shop The Eric Clapton Blackie Stratocaster - recording and live performances
Fender Custom Shop 58 Stratocaster Closet Classic - (40th) Birthday Present from Kuwata Keisuke
Fender Telecaster Pink Paisley (1968) - inspiration for "phantom" came from this guitar's sound
Fender Telecaster - Revolution//Evolution live
Fender Jazz Master (1962)
Fender Jazz Master (1965) - 99 live
Gretsch 6120 Chet Atkins Hollow Body (1959)
Gretsch 6122 Chet Atkins Country Gentleman (1966)
Gretsch G6129T-1957 Silver Jet - Asahi Super Dry CM
Gretsch 6186 Clipper (1966)
Paul Reed Smith Modern Eagle (20th Anniversary)
Paul Reed Smith Private Stock #1728 Custom 24
Paul Reed Smith Private Stock #2751 Custom 24
Rickenbacker 350 JG (1989) - Kokoro colour ~a song for a wonderful year~ PV
Aria-Pro II PE-R100 (1981) - his first guitar purchased in high school
James Tyler Studio Elite Chameleon
ESP Angel Classic V - the 'wings" that Takamizawa-san (THE ALFEE) gave him after Shin Domoto Kyoudai

See also

 List of best-selling music artists in Japan

References

External links

Fukuyama Masaharu's official website (Universal Music) 
Fukuyama Masaharu's official website 
Fukuyama Masaharu AllNightNippon Saturday Special 
Fukuyama Masaharu Suzuki Talking F.M. 

1969 births
Living people
Musicians from Nagasaki Prefecture
Actors from Nagasaki Prefecture
Universal Music Japan artists
Amuse Inc. talents
Taiga drama lead actors
Lead guitarists
Rhythm guitarists
20th-century Japanese male singers
20th-century Japanese singers
20th-century Japanese guitarists
20th-century Japanese male actors
21st-century Japanese male singers
21st-century Japanese singers
21st-century Japanese guitarists
21st-century Japanese male actors
Japanese male pop singers
Japanese male rock singers
Japanese male singer-songwriters
Japanese rock guitarists
Japanese record producers
Japanese male film actors
Japanese male television actors
Japanese radio personalities
Japanese photographers